The Mander baronetcy, of The Mount, Tettenhall Wood, in the County of Staffordshire, was created in the Baronetage of the United Kingdom on 8 July 1911 in the Coronation honours of King George V, for Sir Charles Tertius Mander, English varnish and colour manufacturer (and as such Royal Warrant holder) and public servant.

Mander baronets, of The Mount (1911)
Sir Charles Tertius Mander (16 July 1852 – 8 April 1929), JP, DL, TD, was the eldest son of Charles Benjamin Mander, of The Mount. He was uniquely four times mayor of Wolverhampton 1892-6, an honorary freeman of the borough, a colonel in the Staffordshire Yeomanry, and the first of the Mander family to serve as High Sheriff of Staffordshire. He was an active philanthropist in many public causes. He was a progressive industrialist and manufacturer as first chairman (1924) of Mander Brothers Ltd., the family paint and varnish works, but also in many other companies, including a Midland electrical company credited with the invention of the spark plug. He was created a baronet in the baronetage of the United Kingdom for his public services on 8 July 1911.

Sir Charles Arthur Mander (25 June 1884 – 25 January 1951), JP, DL, TD, the second Baronet, was the elder son of Charles Tertius by Mary Le Mesurier Paint, of Halifax, Nova Scotia. He was twice mayor of Wolverhampton, and an honorary freeman of the borough; he was High Sheriff of Staffordshire. He shot for England, fought in Egypt, Syria, and Palestine in World War I, where he was wounded at Beersheba in 1917, and after the decisive battle of Megiddo entered Damascus in triumph with General Allenby. He was managing director of Mander Brothers Ltd., served on over 65 committees and organisations at one time, was in demand as an authoritative public speaker, and chaired early radio programmes. He was President of Rotary International for Britain and Ireland. In the USA, he was made an honorary chief Red Crow of the Blackfoot tribe in Montana when he gave the address at the dedication of the Waterton-Glacier International Peace Park, the first national park to be so dedicated, in 1932.

Sir Charles Marcus Mander (22 September 1921 – 9 August 2006), the third Baronet, was the only son of Charles Arthur by Monica Neame, of Kent. He fought with the Coldstream Guards in World War II in Italy, where he was gravely wounded in the fierce fighting by Monte Camino in October 1943. He was High Sheriff of Staffordshire. He was a director of Mander Brothers, and redeveloped the centre of Wolverhampton, establishing the Mander Shopping Centre and Mander Square on the site of the 18th-century family works in 1968. He developed a township for 11,500 people at Perton outside Wolverhampton on the family agricultural estate, which had been requisitioned as an airfield during World War II. He was chairman of a number of national property development and investment companies, and farmed in Gloucestershire.

Sir (Charles) Nicholas Mander (born 23 March 1950), the elder son of Charles Marcus by Dolores Brödermann of Hamburg, is the present baronet.  He lives at Owlpen Manor in Gloucestershire.

(Charles) Marcus Septimus Gustav Mander (born 1976), a barrister of the Middle Temple, the eldest son of Charles Nicholas by Karin Margareta Norin, of Stockholm, is the heir apparent to the baronetcy.

Other family members

Sir Geoffrey Le Mesurier Mander  (1882–1962), Member of Parliament, industrialist and art patron
Miles Mander (1888–1946), Hollywood actor, film director, and novelist
Jane Mander (1877–1949), New Zealand novelist
John Mander (1932–1978), writer, poet, cultural critic, translator; son of Geoffrey Mander
Rosalie Glynn Grylls (1905–1988), biographer, lecturer and Liberal Party politician; wife of Geoffrey Mander

See also
Mander family
Mander Brothers

Notes

Sources
Sir Geoffrey Le Mesurier Mander (ed), The History of Mander Brothers (Wolverhampton, 1955)
Charles Nicholas Mander, Varnished Leaves: a biography of the Mander Family of Wolverhampton, 1750–1950 (Owlpen Press, 2005. ISBN 0-9546056-0-8.) [with bibliography and genealogy]
Official Roll of the Baronets (Standing Council of the Baronetage, 2006, 2017)
Kidd, Charles (editor), Debrett's Peerage and Baronetage (Debrett's, 2008, B 626-7)

Mosley, Charles, editor, Burke's Peerage, Baronetage & Knightage, 107th edition, 3 volumes (Burke's Peerage (Genealogical Books) Ltd, 2003), volume 2, page 2589, sub Mander baronetcy of the Mount [U.K.], cr. 1911
Nicholas Mander, Borromean Rings: The Genealogy of the Mander Family, 2011

External links 
Brief History of the Mander family
Sir Charles Marcus Mander: Telegraph obituary
Mander family genealogy
Mander Brothers

Wolverhampton
Baronetcies in the Baronetage of the United Kingdom